Vere Wynne-Jones (29 June 1950 – 23 July 2006) was one of Ireland's best-known broadcasters, as a journalist and commentator on both RTÉ radio and television and also on Dublin radio station Q 102. Wynne-Jones was originally a teacher, then a broadcast journalist, sports commentator, and latterly a public relations advisor and public relations educator. He also had a number of cameo roles in The Den's Christmas Specials. He was the son of a Church of Ireland clergyman, Reverend Martin Jones. Through his mother he was related to the de Veres of Curraghchase.

Wynne-Jones was educated at Villiers Secondary School, Limerick, and later at Trinity, College, Dublin, where he studied economics and politics. His teaching career brought him to Newpark Comprehensive School, Blackrock, County Dublin and he played an important role in the conceptual design of the Transition Year programme.

He was a member of the Masonic Order and discussed the work of the Freemasons on television.

He was a diagnosed with bowel cancer in 2002 and also underwent treatment for liver cancer. He died on 23 July 2006, aged 56.

References

External links
 Obituary by Leo Enright in Sunday Independent, July 30 2006
 Report on the death of Vere Wynne-Jones from RTÉ's news archive (RealMedia).

1950 births
2006 deaths
Alumni of Trinity College Dublin
Deaths from cancer in the Republic of Ireland
Deaths from colorectal cancer
Deaths from liver cancer
Irish Anglicans
Irish journalists
Irish reporters and correspondents
Irish television presenters
Irish radio presenters
People educated at Villiers School
20th-century journalists